Bijar Boneh (also Romanized as Bījār Boneh; also known as Bījār Boneh-ye Kīsūm) is a village in Lafmejan Rural District, in the Central District of Lahijan County, Gilan Province, Iran. At the 2006 census, its population was 49, in 20 families.

References 

Populated places in Lahijan County